The Old Fernald-Laughton Memorial Hospital (also known as the Florida Hotel or George Fernald House) is a historic site in Sanford, Florida, United States. It is located at 500 South Oak Avenue. On May 21, 1987, it was added to the U.S. National Register of Historic Places.

Gallery

References

External links

 Seminole County listings at National Register of Historic Places
 Florida's Office of Cultural and Historical Programs
 Seminole County listings
 Florida Hotel
 Sanford Historical Trail at Historic Hiking Trails

Hospitals in Florida
National Register of Historic Places in Seminole County, Florida
Houses in Seminole County, Florida
Hospital buildings on the National Register of Historic Places in Florida